Ommatophora luminosa is a species of moth in the family Erebidae. The species is found from the Himalayas and Taiwan to Sundaland.

The wingspan is 58–60 mm.

The larvae feed on Bauhinia species. They are mottled and cryptically variegated pinkish brown. Pupation takes place in a light cocoon incorporating petals of the host plant.

References

Moths described in 1780
Ommatophorini
Moths of Asia